David E. Duff (15 June 1901 – 31 December 1977) was an Australian rules footballer who played with Melbourne in the Victorian Football League (VFL).

Although he spent just one season at Melbourne, Duff was a member of a premiership team. He kicked a season best seven goals against Hawthorn at Glenferrie Oval in round 18 and continued his form in the finals with three goals in both the semi final and preliminary final wins. In the 1926 VFL Grand Final he was Melbourne's full-forward and managed two goals.

Duff then became a prolific goal-kicker for Ballarat and in 1927, his first year, set a Ballarat Football League record tally of 113 goals. The record remained until 1953, when surpassed by Redan forward Bill Wells. He also topped the league's goal-kicking in 1928 and 1929.

References

External links

1901 births
Australian rules footballers from Victoria (Australia)
Melbourne Football Club players
Ballarat Football Club players
1977 deaths
Melbourne Football Club Premiership players
One-time VFL/AFL Premiership players